Akari Inaba is a Japanese water polo player. She competed in the 2020 Summer Olympics.

References

1998 births
Living people
Japanese female water polo players
Olympic water polo players of Japan
Water polo players at the 2020 Summer Olympics
21st-century Japanese women
Asian Games medalists in water polo
Water polo players at the 2018 Asian Games
Asian Games bronze medalists for Iran
Medalists at the 2018 Asian Games